M. B. Nirmal is the founder and chairman of Exnora International which is a civic movement in Chennai, Tamil Nadu, India, which deals with environmental issues. In addition to his involvement in Exnora, Nirmal is also involved in consumer advocacy, afforestation programmes, and rehabilitation of convicts among others.

Early life
Nirmal did his schooling in Government Higher secondary school Kundrathur and obtained his graduation from Pachiappa’s college Chetpet, Chennai. He obtained his degree in Law from Madras Law College.

One Hut - One Light

Author
He is author of twelve books in Tamil and six books in English written for individual and societal development. He has been writing in leading Magazines and periodicals regularly.

References

External links

 M. B. Nirmal's Bio on Exnora's Website
 Champions of Chennai 2017 Champion
 Man creates oxygen parlour in his apartment

People from Chennai
Social workers
Living people
1943 births
Indian Tamil people